Gaëlle Ghesquière is a French photographer and journalist and author of books who has achieved fame photographing pop-rock artists on stage such as Madonna, Mick Jagger, David Bowie, Ben Harper, Lenny Kravitz, James Brown and many more.

Biography
Ghesquière was born in Maubeuge in northern France and has lived in the Somme, in the Oise and Paris. During her college education in literature she wrote a thesis on the Walloon-Picard language. She then joined the newspapers Le Figaro and France Soir as an intern and did freelance work. In 1995, she became a photographer by chance. The newspaper Le Figaro she was working for accredited her, as a compensation for her pay, to cover the musical concert of the Red Hot Chili Peppers at the Zenith where  she took pictures with an instant camera. The photographs she took at the concert drew the attention of Philippe Manoeuvre, the founder of the magazine Rock & Folk. She was then assigned to work in a series of collaborations on concerts of Tina Turner, David Bowie, Lenny Kravitz and many others. Madonna had chosen Ghesquière in 2000 to take her pictures to promote her music album.

Following her initial success, Ghesquière has worked with Rock & Folk magazine, Ride On, Blast, etc. and for many newspapers for now more than 20 years taking photographs of famous rock stars at the concerts which have appeared on music album covers. She has authored many books on  her experience with the rock culture and pop-rock artists. She has also published books titled Rock with Me and Rock Access or Behind the scenes in which she has presented portrait pictures of famous rock artists from Lou Reed to Madonna. In the book "Rock with me" she has presented more than 500 images of the famous pop artists which included names like James Brown, Rolling Stones, David Bowie, Patti Smith, AC / DC. The book presents her appreciation of some aspects of the personality of rock stars.

Exhibitions
Ghesquière has held exhibitions of her art work and some of them are:
2004 50 Ans du rock, House of live à Paris 8ème.
2008 Gaëlle Ghesquière, Paris golf & Country club
2010 The Rétrospective of Rolling Stones / Renoma
2010 Who's rock, Galerie Binôme
2011 Festival Images en Scène, La Roche Posay
2011: Exhibition Who's rock ? chez Rockstar, Paris.
2012: Exhibition Who's rock ? à Seyssel.
2013: Exhibition "Les Icônes du Rock" à Étrœungt
2013: Exhibition "ROCK ACCESS" à Paris Galerie BATIGNOLLE'S ART 
2014: Exhibition conférence "les légendes du Rock" Maubeuge Maison Folie,
2015: Exhibition conférence "Les légendes du Rock" Lillers
2016: Exhibition à THE BLACK GALLERY Place des Vosges- Paris
2017: Exhibition ROCK with ME à Noyon

Publications
Some of Ghesquière's published books are:

All Access (De la scène aux coulisses de la pop) (2003)
All Events All Access (2004)    
Ben Harper in Live(2005) (French Edition)
Who's rock? (2008)  (French Edition) 
Rock with Me(2016) (French Edition)

References

Living people
1972 births
French women photographers
20th-century French non-fiction writers
21st-century French non-fiction writers
People from Maubeuge
20th-century French women writers
21st-century French women writers